WDER (1320 AM) and WDER-FM (92.1 FM) are radio stations broadcasting a Christian radio format.  They are the flagship stations of the "Life Changing Radio" network.  WDER AM is licensed to Derry, New Hampshire, and WDER-FM is licensed to Peterborough, New Hampshire.  The stations are owned by Blount Communications, Inc. of NH and feature programming from Salem Radio Network.

In 2012, Blount Communications purchased 92.1 FM, then WFEX, from Phoenix Media/Communications Group, and changed the call letters to WDER-FM, providing WDER AM with a sister station on the FM band to extend its outreach. Prior to the purchase, WFEX had served as a simulcast of WFNX (now WBWL) in Boston.

References

External links

DER
Derry, New Hampshire
Moody Radio affiliate stations
Radio stations established in 1983